The Socialist People's Alliance Party ( Hizb Al-Tahalof Al-Shaeby Al-Ishtiraky, SPAP) is a leftist party in Egypt formed shortly after the Egyptian Revolution of 2011. Its membership comprises many leftist organisations, mainly former members of the Tagammu Party (the only formal leftist party under Hosni Mubarak's reign) who resigned, later joining the party after a split over the party's position on the November 2010 parliamentary elections. The party has been officially recognized on 3 September 2011.

One of the founding members of the party, Fathy Ghareeb, died by suffocation provoked by the tear gas fired by the Central Security Forces (CSF) during the November 2012 Tahrir square clashes.

In November 2013, hundreds of members attempted to resign from the party over party elections as well as a lack of separation from the policies of the state; however, the resignations were rejected by party head Abdel Ghafar Shokr. The former members created the Bread and Freedom Party in late November 2013.

A 32-year-old member of the party named Shaimaa Sabagh was shot in the head and killed by police in Cairo on 24 January 2015.

References

External links
 As Egypt Moves Toward Elections, Anxiety Grows

2011 establishments in Egypt
Organisations of the Egyptian Crisis (2011–2014)
Political parties established in 2011
Socialist parties in Egypt